Friedrich Jung (17 June 1897, in Vienna – 16 March 1975, in Dornbirn) was an Austrian composer.

Selected filmography
 Cruiser Emden (1932)
 Fürst Seppl (1932)
 Die Zwei vom Südexpress (1932)
 Der sündige Hof (1933)

Bibliography
 Spotts, Frederic. Bayreuth: A History of the Wagner Festival. Yale University Press, 1996 .

External links

1897 births
1975 deaths
Austrian composers
Austrian male composers
Austrian film score composers
Male film score composers
Musicians from Vienna
20th-century Austrian composers
20th-century Austrian male musicians